Roving is a long and narrow bundle of fiber.

It may also refer to:
Roving bridge, also known as changeline bridge or turnover bridge, a bridge over a canal constructed to allow a horse towing a boat to cross the canal when the towpath changes sides
Roving Enterprises, Australian television production company
Roving reference, also called roaming reference, a library service model in which, instead of being positioned at a static reference desk, a librarian moves throughout the library to locate patrons with questions or concerns and offer them help in finding or using library resources
Roving wiretap, a wiretap that follows the surveillance target

See also
 Roving Boy (1980–1983), American Champion Thoroughbred racehorse
 Roving Crows, English folk fusion band
 The Maid of Amsterdam, sea shanty also known as "A-Roving"